Henry Bulkeley (–1698) was an English courtier and politician.

Bulkeley was the fifth son of Thomas Bulkeley, 1st Viscount Bulkeley and Blanche Coytmore. He was educated at Queens' College, Cambridge and admitted at Gray's Inn in 1654. He was Master of the Household of Kings Charles II and James II of England, Member of Parliament from February 1679 to August 1679 for the constituency of Anglesey and from 1679 until 1689 for Beaumaris.

 François de Bulkeley, Lieutenant-general; husband of Marie-Anne O'Mahony, daughter of Daniel O'Mahony and Cecilia Weld.
 Charlotte; first wife of Charles O'Brien, 5th Viscount Clare, and later of Daniel O'Mahony.
 Anne (d. 12 June 1751); married James FitzJames, 1st Duke of Berwick, illegitimate son of James II.

References

Rochester, Dryden, and the Rose-Street Affair; J. Harold Wilson; The Review of English Studies, Vol. 15, No. 59 (Jul., 1939), pp. 294–301
Godolphin- his life and times; Sir Tresham Lever; J. Murray 1952.
The Irish chieftains; or, A struggle for the crown; C.J. Blake Forester; 1872.

1640s births
1698 deaths
Masters of the Household
Members of the Parliament of England (pre-1707) for constituencies in Wales
Tory MPs (pre-1834)
Members of Gray's Inn
Alumni of Queens' College, Cambridge
Younger sons of viscounts
English MPs 1679
English MPs 1680–1681
English MPs 1681
English MPs 1685–1687
Members of the Parliament of England for Beaumaris
Bulkeley family